Janjal Pura is a Pakistani humorous television series broadcast on Pakistan Television Corporation. It revolves around a small town where people from different passions and of different natures live, and try to outdo others. It was written by Shahid Nadeem and directed by Tariq Jamil. It aired in 1997.

Plot 
Maasi Phatto, Raju Nai, Khwaja Sara Reema and Resham, cunning nurses of family planning and the newly appointed gynecologist lady doctor are some of the characters from Janjal Pura who live here and try to raise its standard. All of its inhabitants work hard in their respective fields and but are not on good terms with as they try to outdo each other. However, they unite when their hometown is threatened by some foreign danger.

Cast 
 Nayyar Ejaz as Cheemi Guru
 Mehmood Aslam as Reema
 Savera Nadeem as Mahjabeen
 Khalid Butt as Master Hidayat Ullah
 Madeeha Gauhar as Politician
 Asim Bukhari as Sheikh Ji
 Naseem Vicky as Chambeli
 Mehwish Aapa as Sughran
 Ashraf Khan as Kareem Bukhsh

References 

1990s Pakistani television series
Pakistan Television Corporation original programming
Pakistani comedy television series